Simon Perchik (December 24, 1923 – June 14, 2022) was an American poet who has been described by Library Journal as, "the most widely published unknown poet in America."  Perchik worked as an attorney before his retirement in 1980.  Educated at New York University, he later resided in East Hampton, New York.  Best known for his highly personal, non-narrative style of poetry, Perchik's work has appeared in over 30 books, websites including Verse Daily, Jacket and numerous print magazines, including The New Yorker, Poetry, Partisan Review, The Nation, North American Review, Weave Magazine, JuxtaProse Literary Magazine, and CLUTCH. His poetry collection, Hands Collected was longlisted for the 2000 National Book Award for Poetry.

On June 14, 2022, Perchik died surrounded by his family at the VA Hospital in New York City. He was 98.

Selected bibliography
 "Bomber's Moon" (1949, Self-published, written on a rented typewriter and printed on a rented mimeograph machine)
 "I Counted Only April" (1964, The Elizabeth Press)
 "Twenty Years of Hands" (1966, The Elizabeth Press)
 "Which Hand Holds The Brother" (1969, The Elizabeth Press)
 "Hands You Are Secretly Wearing" (1972, The Elizabeth Press)
 "Both Hands Screaming" (1975, The Elizabeth Press)
 "The Club Fits Either Hand" (1979, The Elizabeth Press)
 "Mr Lucky" (1984, Shearsman Books)
 "The Snowcat Poems 1980-81, To the Photographs of Robert Frank" (1984, Linwood Publishers)
 "Who Can Touch These Knots: New and Selected Poems" (1985, The Scarecrow Press)
 "The Gandolf Poems" (1988, White Pine Press)
 "Redeeming The Wings" (1991, Dusty Dog Press)
 "Birthmark" (1992, Flockophobic Press)
 "The Emptiness Between My Hands" (1993, Dusty Dog Press)
 "Letters to the Dead" (1993, St. Andrews College Press)
 "*" ("Shearsman 19") (1994, Shearsman Books)
 "These Hands Filled With Numbness" (1996, Dusty Dog Press)
 "Hands Collected 1949-1999" (2000, Pavement Saw Press) (Second Edition, 2003)
 "Touching the Headstone"  (2000, Stride Publications)
 "The Autochthon Poems" (2001, Split/Shift)
 "Rafts" (2007, Parsifal Editions)
 "Almost Rain" (2013, River Otter Press) 
 "D Poems" (2016, Penny University Press e-book)
 The Osiris Poems (2017, box of chalk) 
 Dreams I’ve Held – Uncollected Poems (1943-1979)(2021, Cholla Needles) 
 The Family Of Man Poems (1982–1990) (2021, Cholla Needles) 
 The Weston Poems (1991–1994) (2021, Cholla Needles) 
 Paper The Sun (1995–1996) (2021, Cholla Needles) 
 Peel The Sun (1997–1998) (2021, Cholla Needles) 
 The D Poems (2016) (2020, Cholla Needles - print version) 
 The Reflection in a Glass Eye Poems (2018) (2020, Cholla Needles) 
 The Gibson Poems (2019) (2019, Cholla Needles) 
 The Rosenblum Poems (2020) (2020, Cholla Needles) 
 The Elliott Erwitt Poems (2022) (2022, Cholla Needles)

References

Repositories 

 Library of Congress, The Rare Book Collection.
 Simon Perchik Papers. Yale Collection of American Literature, Beinecke Rare Book and Manuscript Library.
 Ohio State University Library, Avant Writing Collection.

External links
 Simon Perchik homepage
 Simon Perchik Essay on writing - Magic Illusion and Other Realities
 An Interview with Simon Perchik
 A poem by Simon Perchik 
 8 Poems by Simon Perchik
 Simon Perchik in Conversation with David Baratier
 2 Recent Poems by Simon Perchik
 Poem appearing in Blue Lake Review (June, 2012)
 'Almost Rain' Product Page
 'D Poems' , an electronic book download

1923 births
2022 deaths
American male poets
People from East Hampton (town), New York
Poets from New York (state)
Writers from Paterson, New Jersey
Poets from New Jersey
New York University alumni
20th-century American poets
21st-century American poets
20th-century American male writers
21st-century American male writers
Writers from New York (state)
American lawyers